Dobellia is a genus of parasitic alveolates of the phylum Apicomplexia.

History

The species and genus was described in 1913 by Brumpt.

Description

Dobellia binucleata infects the intestinal cells of the sipunculid worm Golflngia minutum

References

Apicomplexa genera